Qui studio a voi stadio (known also by the acronym QSVS) is a sports talk and debate television program produced by Telelombardia and aired on various affiliated local television channels in Italy, entirely devoted to Italian Soccer, in particular the Serie A.

Similar programs ruled by the same redaction
With similar formats, the sport redaction of Telelombardia (owned by the "Gruppo Mediapason" (Mediapason Group)) rules also other programs that are broadcast on their channels:

Azzurro Italia (Italy's light blue) is a program broadcast from 8:30PM to 11PM (QSVS is from 8PM) with some differences in the graphic setting. It is on every Tuesday, Wednesday (when there is noe Champions League, in this case there is QSVS), Thursday and Friday. After 11PM the program changes its name to "Azzurro Italia Notte" (Italy's Light Blue Night) generally the number of guests reduces to 3 or 4 and the themes discussed are often about the transfer market. In addition to this there is also another program, called Azzurro Italia News (Italy light blue news), on from 7:00 PM to 8:00 PM, which is very similar to "Azzurro Italia Notte".
Lunedì di Rigore (Monday of penalty, (sort of word game)), as the name suggest this program is aired every Monday and it probably is the most popular broadcast after QSVS (on match days). It is usually hosted by the director of the redaction, Fabio Ravezzani, and the program treats interesting arguments like  the "moviola" (re-watch controversial game actions and discussing about the referee's actions). It is on from 8:30PM to 11PM and after 11:00 PM  another program is aired called "Lunedi di rigore Notte" (the night version) similar to "Azzurro Italia Notte".
TG Calcio 24 (TG Football/Soccer 24) and QSVS News, the first is broadcast from 8:00 PM to 8:30 PM every day except when QSVS is aired, it has different format from the others, because there is an only host who says news and does telephone calls with some of the guests that take part to the broadcasts. QSVS News is similar but there are two hosts.
Diretta Calcio (Football/Soccer live), while the previous programs are transmitted on Top Calcio 24, AntennaTre and Telelombardia (and affiliates channels)  Diretta Calcio is almost all aired on  Top Calcio 24 ( also available via streaming). It is on in the morning, in the afternoon and also during matches sometimes they use it like a commenting space different from the QSVS' one). In the early morning (7 AM - 8AM) there is a host who does the press review.
This one of the two programs in which are allowed home telephone calls.

Commentators and Presenters

Current commentators and presenters
 Fabio Ravezzani
 Gian Luca Rossi
 Marcello Chirico
 Cristiano Ruiu
 Lapo De Carlo
 Alfio Musmarra
 Matteo Colturani
 Mauro Suma
 Luigi Furini
 Cesare Pompilio
 Claudio Garioni
 Nicola Gallo
 Stefano Donati
 Daniele Porro
 Federico Faranda
 Andrea Longoni
 Maurizio Dall'O'
 Marco Signorelli
 Matteo Caronni
 Alessandro Vesce
 Onofrio Di Lernia
 Gino Bacci
 Gianmarco Piacentini

Former commentators and presenters

 Michele Plastino
 Dante Ferrari
 Paola Ferrari
 Maurizio Mosca
 Enzo Catania
 Tiziano Crudeli
 Evaristo Beccalossi
 Nagaja Beccalossi
 Simone Malagutti
 David Messina
 Giorgio Micheletti
 Tony Damascelli
 Elio Corno
 Umberto Colombo
 Carlo Pellegatti
 Davide Fontolan
 Andrea Cocchi
 Mauro Bellugi
 Pietro Anastasi
 Giovanni Guardalà
 Mario Ielpo
 Luca Cattani
 Andrea Bosio
 Michelangelo Rampulla
 Claudio Lippi
 Joe Denti
 Teodora Stefanova
 Mauro di Francesco
 Luca Serafini
 Furio Fedele
 Domenico Marocchino

Italian sports television series
1987 Italian television series debuts
1980s Italian television series